Kyle Johannsen is a Canadian philosopher who is the author of a A Conceptual Investigation of Justice (2018) and Wild Animal Ethics (2020). He specialises in animal and environmental ethics, as well as political and social philosophy. He is presently affiliated with Trent University, Wilfrid Laurier University, and Queen's University.

Education and career
Johannesen read for a BA in philosophy with a minor in history at York University from 2003 to 2007, before reading for an MA in philosophy at the same institution from 2007 to 2009. He read for a PhD in philosophy at Queen's University from 2010 to 2015. Johannesen took up visiting assistant professorships at Saint Mary's University, Halifax from 2016 to 2017, and then at Trent University from 2017 to 2018. He remained a course instructor at Trent from 2018, and also became a course instructor at Wilfrid Laurier University in 2019. In 2020, Johannsen became an adjunct assistant professor at Queen's, as well as a fellow in Animals in Politics, Philosophy, Law, and Ethics (APPLE) at the university.

Works 
Johannsen published A Conceptual Investigation of Justice in 2018. It was the subject of a symposium at the Canadian Philosophical Association's 2018 meeting; the presented papers were later published in Dialogue: Canadian Philosophical Review.

Wild Animal Ethics was published in 2020; a symposium was held by APPLE at Queen's University in the same year, with the papers later published in Philosophia. It was reviewed by Thomas Lepeltier in the French-language popular science magazine Sciences Humaines.

References

External links 

 "Kyle Johannsen on the Predation Problem" - Herbivorize Predators
 "Can Addressing Wild Animal Suffering Prevent the next Pandemic?" - Forum Daily
 "That’s moral progress – you have to interfere in things" – Philosopher Kyle Johannsen - Sentientism Conversations podcast
 Reducing wild animal suffering with Kyle Johannsen - Knowing Animals podcast
 Kyle Johannsen, "Wild Animal Ethics: The Moral and Political Problem of Wild Animal Suffering" (Routledge, 2020) - New Books in Philosophy podcast

Year of birth missing (living people)
21st-century Canadian philosophers
Animal ethicists
Canadian animal rights scholars
Canadian ethicists
Canadian political philosophers
Environmental ethicists
Queen's University at Kingston alumni
Academic staff of Queen's University at Kingston
Social philosophers
Academic staff of Trent University
York University alumni
Living people